Renta 4 Banco is a financial institution specializing in investment products and services and is the only investment services company listed on the Spanish stock exchange (Madrid, Barcelona, Bilbao and Valencia) and a member of the General Investment Guarantee Fund (FOGAIN).

Its head office is in Madrid, 57 offices are throughout Spain and international offices are in Chile, Colombia and Peru.

References 
Article contains translated text from Renta 4 Banco on the Spanish Wikipedia retrieved on 10 March 2017.

financial services companies of Spain
Banks established in 1986
1986 establishments in Spain
Spanish companies established in 1986
Companies listed on the Madrid Stock Exchange
Companies based in Madrid